Plunderers of Painted Flats is a 1959 American Western film shot in Naturama was directed by Albert C. Gannaway and written by John Greene and Phil Shuken. The film stars Corinne Calvet, John Carroll, Skip Homeier, George Macready, Edmund Lowe and Bea Benaderet. The film was released on January 23, 1959, by Republic Pictures and was the last film that they had produced and released.

Plot

Cast
Corinne Calvet as Kathy Martin
John Carroll as Clint Jones
Skip Homeier as Joe Martin
George Macready as Ed Sampson
Edmund Lowe as Ned East
Bea Benaderet as Ella Heather
Madge Kennedy as Mary East
Joe Besser as Andy Heather
Allan Lurie as Cass Becker
Candy Candido as Bartender
Herb Vigran as Mr. Perry
Burt Topper as Bart

References

External links 
 

1959 films
American Western (genre) films
1959 Western (genre) films
Republic Pictures films
1950s English-language films
Films directed by Albert C. Gannaway
1950s American films